The Man in the Saddle can refer to:

The Man in the Saddle (1925 film), a 1925 German film
The Man in the Saddle (1926 film), a 1926 American film
The Man in the Saddle (1945 film), a 1945 German film
Man in the Saddle (1951 film), a 1951 American film